William Lasseter (May 6, 1941 – August 16, 2017) was a Canadian football player who played for the BC Lions. He won the Grey Cup with them in 1964. He died of Parkinson's disease in 2017.

References

1941 births
2017 deaths
BC Lions players
Canadian football people from Vancouver
Players of Canadian football from British Columbia